The Lithuanian Catholic Women's Organization was a Lithuanian women's organization. Founded in 1908, it was the largest women's organization in interwar Lithuania. It was disestablished after the Soviet occupation of Lithuania in 1940.

In 1907, the First Congress of Lithuanian Women took place in Kaunas. On the congress it was decided that a national women's organisation should be founded. However, due to the split between Catholic and liberal women, the plan could not be realised, and instead they founded separate women's organisations instead.

See also
 Lithuanian Women's Union

References 

 Virginija Jurėnienė, Lietuvių moterų judėjimas XIX a. pab.-XX a. pirmojoje pusėje, 2006, Vilnius.

1908 establishments in Lithuania
Organizations established in 1908
Feminist organizations in Lithuania
1940 disestablishments in Lithuania
Organizations disestablished in 1940